Concurrent jurisdiction exists where two or more courts from different systems simultaneously have jurisdiction over a specific case. This situation often leads to forum shopping, as parties will try to have their civil or criminal case heard in the court that they perceive will be most favorable to them.

United States
In the United States, concurrent jurisdiction exists to the extent that the United States Constitution permits federal courts to hear actions that can also be heard by state courts. For example, when a party from Alabama sues a party from Florida for a breach of contract, the Alabama party can sue in either federal court (under its diversity jurisdiction) or in the state court located in Florida (under its personal jurisdiction over the defendant).  Concurrent jurisdiction may also be created where the United States Congress, in creating a cause of action, permits the courts of the states to hear cases alleging that cause of action. For example, a state court may hear a claim for trademark infringement under the Lanham Act.

Concurrent jurisdiction in the United States can also exist between different levels of state courts, and between courts and other government agencies with judicial powers. Different countries can also share concurrent jurisdiction over a case, where different countries have authority over the parties or events giving rise to the cause of action. 

Title 28 of the United States Code, sections 1331 & 1332 give federal courts concurrent jurisdiction with the state courts over federal question and diversity cases.

Medieval Catholic Church
In the Middle Ages, the Church expanded its jurisdiction in many areas of Europe widely beyond the original scope of ecclesiastical courts concerning spiritual or religious matters, thereby creating concurrent jurisdiction in many civil cases with the courts instituted by secular authorities.

See also
Lis alibi pendens
 Original jurisdiction
 Condominium

References

Civil procedure
Jurisdiction